Potomac–Broadway Historic District is a national historic district at Hagerstown, Washington County, Maryland, United States. The district is located in the north downtown area and consists largely of a late 19th and early 20th century residential area with most buildings dating from 1870 to 1930. Architectural styles represented include Victorian Gothic, Queen Anne, Colonial Revival, and American Foursquare.

It was added to the National Register of Historic Places in 1990.

References

External links
, including photo from 1990, at Maryland Historical Trust
Boundary Map of the Potomac–Broadway Historic District, Washington County, at Maryland Historical Trust

Historic districts in Washington County, Maryland
Hagerstown, Maryland
Historic districts on the National Register of Historic Places in Maryland
National Register of Historic Places in Washington County, Maryland